The Consulate-General of Venezuela in Houston (Spanish: Consulado General de la República Bolivariana de Venezuela en Houston) is a diplomatic mission of Venezuela in Houston, Texas, United States. It is located at Suite 220 at 2401 Fountain View Drive. The consulate serves Texas, Kansas, New Mexico, and Oklahoma.

History
At one point the consulate was located in Suite 900 at 2925 Briarpark Drive in the Westchase area of Houston. In August 2008 the Venezuelans asked for permission to move to a new location. Nichole Thompson, a United States State Department spokesperson, said that the Venezuelan officials moved into the new location before receiving permission from the U.S. officials. Therefore, in November of that year the United States State Department announced that it would revoke the visas of the diplomats at the Houston office and close it. The consulate resumed normal operations on December 1 of that year.

The consulate has been closed for many months, and still was when checked on June 22, 2019.  This is contrary to their website which states it is open from 9 AM to noon Monday to Friday.

See also

 Diplomatic missions of Venezuela

References

External links
 Consulado General de la República Bolivariana de Venezuela en Houston (Spanish)

Venezuela
Houston
United States–Venezuela relations